Banc Vailheu is a submerged volcano in the Comoro Islands group. Banc Vailheu is a wall Scuba diving location.

References

Volcanoes of the Comoros
Volcanoes of the Indian Ocean